Keith Richardson may refer to:

Keith Richardson (television executive), British television executive
Keith Richardson (tennis) (born 1953), American tennis player